Friendships Often Fade Away is the debut album by the American post punk band Audio Learning Center, released in 2002 through Vagrant Records.

Critical reception
The Pitch wrote that singer "[Christopher] Brady’s most effective material recalls mournful tales of souls haunted by tainted love and shattered pasts."

Track listing

Personnel

Audio Learning Center
Christopher E. Brady – Lead vocals, bass, art direction, engineer, producer
Steven Birch – Guitar, backing vocals art direction, design, layout design, wurlitzer
Paul Johnson – Drums, percussion

Artwork
Rick Boston – Cover painting
Marc Trunz – Artwork
 

Production
Adam Kasper – Producer, engineer, mixing
Adam Ayan – Mastering
Rob Bartleson – Assistant Engineer
Dave Friedlander – Engineer
Sam Hofstedt – Engineer
John McBain – Engineer
Lars Fox – Pro-Tools
Sean Cox – Technical Assistance
Greg Keplinger – Technical Assistance

References

2002 debut albums
Audio Learning Center albums
Albums produced by Adam Kasper
Vagrant Records albums